Strikeforce/M-1 Global: Fedor vs. Werdum was a mixed martial arts event held by Strikeforce in association with M-1 Global on June 26, 2010 at HP Pavilion in San Jose, California.

Background
Josh Thomson was originally set to face Lyle Beerbohm at this event.  On May 21, Thomson announced that Beerbohm was injured in his previous fight with Vítor Ribeiro, and will be replaced.  Pat Healy ended up facing Thomson.

M-1 Global fighter Magomed Shikhshabekov was scheduled to face American Kickboxing Academy fighter Ron Keslar.  However, Shikhshabekov was forced off the card due to visa issues, and was replaced by Chris Cope.

The event drew an estimated 492,000 viewers on Showtime.

Results

Reported payout

The following is a list of fighter salaries as provided by the California State Athletic Commission. The figures do not include deductions for items such as insurance, licenses and taxes. Additionally, the figures do not include money paid by sponsors, which can often be a substantial portion of a fighter's income.

Fabrício Werdum: $100,000 (no win bonus) def. Fedor Emelianenko: $400,000
Cung Le: $100,000 (no win bonus) def. Scott Smith: $55,000
Cris Cyborg: $35,000 ($15,000 win bonus plus $5,000 champion bonus) def. Jan Finney: $6,000
Josh Thomson: $60,000 (no win bonus) def. Pat Healy: $8,000
Chris Cope: $3,000 ($1,000 win bonus) def. Ron Keslar: $1,500
Bret Bergmark: $3,000 ($1,500 win bonus) def. Vagner Rocha: $2,500
Yancy Medeiros: $8,000 ($4,000 win bonus) def. Gareth Joseph: $2,000
Bobby Stack: $2,800 ($1,500 win bonus) def. Derrick Burnsed: $2,000

Notes
Strikeforce commentator, former UFC Light Heavyweight champion, and former King of Pancrase, Frank Shamrock announced his retirement from Mixed Martial Arts at this event.

References

See also
 Strikeforce (mixed martial arts)
 List of Strikeforce champions
 List of Strikeforce events
 2010 in Strikeforce

Fedor vs. Werdum
M-1 Global events
2010 in mixed martial arts
Mixed martial arts in San Jose, California
2010 in sports in California
Events in San Jose, California